Palys or Pałys is a Polish surname. Notable people with the surname include:

 Andrzej Pałys (born 1957), Polish politician
 Stan Palys (1930–2021), American baseball player

See also
 

Polish-language surnames